Joseph L. Kirschvink (born 1953) is an American geologist and geophysicist.  He is the Nico and Marilyn Van Wingen Professor of Geobiology at Caltech, known for contributions to paleomagnetism and biomagnetism (discovery of the first magnetofossils) and the Snowball Earth hypothesis. He is also Principal Investigator (PI) of Earth–Life Science Institute.

Biography 
In 1988, Kirschvink was recognized as a "Rising Star" in Southern California by the Los Angeles Times. In 2021, Caltech settled with the Department of the Interior to pay $25,465 for damages to petroglyph sites in Volcanic Tablelands after they were damaged by Dr. Kirschvink on Earth Day 2017.

See also
Greenhouse and icehouse Earth

References

American geophysicists
Paleomagnetism
California Institute of Technology faculty
1953 births
Living people